Sefer Seferi (born 5 March 1979) is an Albanian professional boxer who challenged for the IBO cruiserweight title in 2019. His older brother Nuri Seferi is also a professional boxer.

Boxing career
Seferi was born in Gostivar, SFR Yugoslavia (now North Macedonia), and is of Albanian heritage. Whilst in Yugoslavia both he and brother Nuri started out wrestling, a sport which their grandfather had competed in professionally. In 1992 the family fled from Gostivar and moved to Burgdorf, Switzerland. Both brothers took up boxing in order to help with integration into Swiss society.

Seferi made his professional debut in May 2007 in the cruiserweight division. Over the next 9 years he built up a record of 21–0 with 19 knockouts, albeit against low level opposition.

On 17 September 2016, Seferi fought former WBC heavyweight title challenger and future WBA heavyweight champion Manuel Charr for WBA International heavyweight title, with Seferi making the step up to heavyweight for the first time. Charr defeated Seferi by unanimous decision after 10 rounds, ending Seferi's unbeaten record.

On 20 May 2018, Seferi was announced as the first opponent for the return of former unified and lineal heavyweight champion Tyson Fury, with the fight set to take place on 9 June at Manchester Arena. The fight would be Fury's first since he beat Wladimir Klitschko to become champion more than two and half years previously in November 2015. In April 2018, several weeks before Fury's opponent was announced, several press outlets reported Seferi was rumoured to have been chosen, with Seferi himself quoted as saying, "This would make my dream come true. I never thought I'd have the chance to stand against Fury, he is my idol. Fury is a boxing legend of the 21st century. He is tall, has weight and strength but moves easily, and he dethroned Klitschko. Fury is a bear." The fight ended in a disappointing fourth round corner retirement loss for Seferi.

On 21 September 2019, he challenged Kevin Lerena in Gauteng, South Africa for his IBO cruiserweight title, but was unsuccessful and lost via third-round technical knockout.

Professional boxing record

{|class="wikitable" style="text-align:center; font-size:95%"
|-
!
!Result
!Record
!Opponent
!Type
!Round, time
!Date
!Location
!Notes
|-
|- 
|28
|Win
|24–3–1
|style="text-align:left;"| Laszlo Ivanyi
|RTD
|5 (12) 
|30 Nov 2019
|align=left|
|style="text-align:left;"|
|-
|27
|Loss
|23–3–1
|style="text-align:left;"| Kevin Lerena
|TKO
|3 (12) 
|21 Sep 2019
|style="text-align:left;"| 
|style="text-align:left;"|
|-
|26
|Draw
|23–2–1
|style="text-align:left;"| Firat Arslan
|
|12
|17 Nov 2018
|style="text-align:left;"| 
|style="text-align:left;"|
|-
|25
|Loss
|23–2
|align=left| Tyson Fury
|RTD
|4 (10), 
|9 Jun 2018
|align=left|
|align=left|
|-
|24
|Win
|23–1
|align=left| Laszlo Hubert
|KO
|2 (8)
|16 Mar 2018
|align=left|
|align=left|
|-
|23
|Win
|22–1
|align=left| Marcelo Ferreira dos Santos
|KO
|5 (12)
|1 Apr 2017
|align=left|
|align=left|
|-
|22
|Loss
|21–1
|align=left| Manuel Charr
|UD
|10
|17 Sep 2016
|align=left|
|align=left|
|-
|21
|Win
|21–0
|align=left| Laszlo Hubert
|TKO
|2 (12)
|23 Apr 2016
|align=left|
|align=left|
|-
|20
|Win
|20–0
|align=left| Radenko Kovac
|KO
|1 (6)
|27 Jun 2015
|align=left|
|align=left|
|-
|19
|Win
|19–0
|align=left| Sasa Dajic
|KO
|1 (8)
|9 May 2015
|align=left|
|align=left|
|-
|18
|Win
|18–0
|align=left| Josef Krivka
|TKO
|1 (6)
|16 May 2014
|align=left|
|align=left|
|-
|17
|Win
|17–0
|align=left| Josip Jalusic
|TKO
|1 (6)
|26 Apr 2014
|align=left|
|align=left|
|-
|16
|Win
|16–0
|align=left| Gyula Bozai
|UD
|6
|7 Oct 2012
|align=left|
|align=left|
|-
|15
|Win
|15–0
|align=left| Marko Angermann
|TKO
|6 (6)
|11 Feb 2012
|align=left|
|align=left|
|-
|14
|Win
|14–0
|align=left| Josip Jalusic
|TKO
|6 (8)
|15 Oct 2011
|align=left|
|align=left|
|-
|13
|Win
|13–0
|align=left| Gabor Zsalek
|TKO
|2 (12)
|24 Sep 2011
|align=left|
|align=left|
|-
|12
|Win
|12–0
|align=left| Istvan Bobis
|TKO
|2 (6)
|27 Nov 2010
|align=left|
|align=left|
|-
|11
|Win
|11–0
|align=left| Viktor Szalai
|TKO
|2 (12)
|26 Jun 2010
|align=left|
|align=left|
|-
|10
|Win
|10–0
|align=left| Tomislav Juric Grgic
|TKO
|4 (6)
|26 Dec 2009
|align=left|
|align=left|
|-
|9
|Win
|9–0
|align=left| Ferenc Zsalek
|KO
|1 (6)
|5 Dec 2009
|align=left|
|align=left|
|-
|8
|Win
|8–0
|align=left| Gyorgy Mihalik
|TKO
|3 (6)
|25 Jul 2009
|align=left|
|align=left|
|-
|7
|Win
|7–0
|align=left| Ivica Cukusic
|
|4 (6)
|18 Apr 2009
|align=left|
|align=left|
|-
|6
|Win
|6–0
|align=left| Roman Klucar
|TKO
|2 (6)
|20 Dec 2008
|align=left|
|align=left|
|-
|5
|Win
|5–0
|align=left| Attila Makula
|TKO
|4 (6)
|28 Nov 2008
|align=left|
|align=left|
|-
|4
|Win
|4–0
|align=left| Gyorgy Mihalik
|
|6 (6)
|28 Jun 2008
|align=left|
|align=left|
|-
|3
|Win
|3–0
|align=left| Jonathan Pasi
|TKO
|5 (6)
|3 May 2008
|align=left|
|align=left|
|-
|2
|Win
|2–0
|align=left| Drazen Ordulj
|
|6
|8 Dec 2007
|align=left|
|align=left|
|-
|1
|Win
|1–0
|align=left| Anton Lascek
|
|4 (6)
|26 May 2007
|align=left|
|align=left|

References

1979 births
Living people
Albanian male boxers
Albanian expatriate sportspeople in Switzerland
Cruiserweight boxers
Heavyweight boxers
People from Gostivar